Kosovo declaration of independence may refer to:

1990 Kosovo declaration of independence
2008 Kosovo declaration of independence